Indra Nath Bhagat is an Indian politician. He was a Member of Parliament, representing Lohardaga, Bihar in the Lok Sabha the lower house of India's Parliament as a member of the Indian National Congress.

References

External links
Official biographical sketch in Parliament of India website

Lok Sabha members from Jharkhand
Indian National Congress politicians
1946 births
Living people
People from Lohardaga district